Macromidia donaldi is a species of dragonfly in the family Synthemistidae. It is known only from the Western Ghats of India and from Sri Lanka.

Description and habitat
It is a small metallic-green dragonfly with emerald-green eyes. Its lateral sides of the thorax and dorsal side of the abdomen have yellow stripes up to segment 6. Segment 7 has a broad "ace of clubs" like mark on dorsal side. Remaining segments are unmarked. Female is similar to the male. They are crepuscular in nature and rest in vegetation near forest streams during day.

See also
 List of odonates of India
 List of odonates of Sri Lanka
 List of odonata of Kerala

References

Synthemistidae